is a Japanese manga artist born in Tokyo in 1967 and raised in Chiba. As a teenager he was influenced by the mecha anime Armored Trooper Votoms and Mobile Suit Gundam, in particular the designs of Yoshikazu Yasuhiko, as well as the works of manga artist Rumiko Takahashi. He began his career at age 17, with his debut manga, Space Oddity, in the Weekly Shonen Sunday. He is best known for the cyberpunk series Battle Angel Alita.

Works

 Hito (1997), a collection of short stories:
 
 
 
 
 
 

 Battle Angel Alita series:

Adaptations 

 Battle Angel (1993), original video animation directed by Hiroshi Fukutomi, based on the manga Battle Angel Alita
 Alita: Battle Angel (2019), film directed by Robert Rodriguez, based on the manga Battle Angel Alita

References

External links
 
 
 
 
 

1967 births
Living people
Manga artists from Tokyo
People from Ōta, Tokyo
Cyberpunk writers